The T91 is a gas-operated, magazine-fed, assault rifle produced by the 205th Armory of National Defense in Republic of China (aka Taiwan). It is based on the proven T86 assault rifle, incorporating features from the M16 and AR-18 with more modern features. The T91 is lighter and shorter than the T65 it replaces, and has an adjustable 3-position telescoping stock.

History
The T91 was a further development of the T86, which had been intended to replace the T65 series in Taiwanese military service. Experience on the previous design and feedback from various users were incorporated into the T91. Development was completed in 2002, and full volume production commenced in 2003.

The T91 was designed with the capabilities of the People's Liberation Army in mind, and is superior to the Type 81 assault rifle. It also has advantages over the QBZ-95, China's current standard issue assault rifle.

There are rumors that arms dealers had secretly inquired about the possibility of sales to certain militant groups in Southeast Asia, but were reportedly rejected by the Republic of China Ministry of National Defense (MND). The MND neither confirmed nor denied such rumors.

Design

The T91 is a gas-operated short-stroke, air-cooled, rotating bolt, magazine- or drum-fed, select-fire, modularized military rifle compatible with various tactical accessories. Similar to the T86, the T91 is shorter than the T65K2 assault rifle, giving the operator higher mobility and ease of aiming in a confined space.

The T91 has a 4-position selector switch: S – safe, 1 – semi-automatic, 3 – three-round burst, and A – automatic. Like the T65K2, the T91 utilises an M16A2-style front post and rear peephole sight. The rear sight, mounted on the detachable handle, is adjustable for windage and elevation. Operation of the charging handle, magazine release, and bolt release are also the same as the M16. One notable difference is that the T91 does not have a forward assist, and the brass deflector is not as pronounced.

The action of the T91 is based on the T65 series. The T91 also inherits the modularized gas piston system from the T86, allowing easy removal for maintenance without the risk of losing small parts.

The telescoping stock on the T91 was designed based on the experience of military and police personnel with the M4 Carbine. The resulting product has improved recoil transfer and handling qualities. A rubber recoil pad is also added for comfort. The handguards are triangular in shape.

The T91 has a  barrel with flash suppressor. Due to the use of a shorter barrel, the T91 has 20% more recoil than the T65K2. The chamber and bore are chrome-lined and can fire all standard 5.56×45mm NATO ammunition. Standard-issue 30-round detachable box magazines for the T91 feature indicator holes for the top 2-15 rounds as well as two protrusions on each side to avoid over-insertion. However, standard STANAG magazines may also be used.

Accessories
The T91 has a MIL-STD-1913 picatinny rail on the top of the receiver, handguard, and the front-sight block. The standard-issue detachable handle can be removed to accommodate a variety of optical sights and scopes. It can also be equipped with the T85 40mm grenade launcher to serve in a squad-level fire support role.

The Chung-Shan Institute of Science and Technology developed a T91 indoor shooting simulator for infantry marksmanship training. This equipment is capable of simulating various weather conditions, shooting distances, and wind states.

For training purposes, a paintball conversion kit is also provided.

Other attachments include red dot sights and holographic weapon sights.

Variants

The T91K3 features polygonal rifling which increases barrel life and improves accuracy. The 205th Arsenal and the National Defense University are jointly developing a nickel-boron finish for the bolt carriers, which would allow the weapon to fire about 10,500 rounds without any lubrication whatsoever.

List of variants

 T91 assault rifle
Tactical rail and grip added to handguard. 
 T91S: Barrel wall thickened to improve accuracy and extend shooting time. Lightweight handguard with tactical rail added in place of the original. New Magpul stock added.
 T91K1: Heavier barrel added. New handguard with tactical rail is added. UTG front grip bipod added. New Magpul MOE SL stock added. 
 T91K2
 T91K3: New barrel added. Increases accuracy by 2.5 times and barrel life by 2 times.

Production and usage
In 2003, the Taiwanese Army ordered 101,162 T91 combat rifles as force-wide replacements of all service rifles, with a delivery schedule from 2004 to 2008. The total budget amount was NT$1,803 million (US$54.6 million), placing the unit price at about NT$17,800 (US$539). As of April 2006, nine Taiwanese Army armoured, mechanized infantry, and infantry brigades have fully converted to the T91.

In 2005, the Taiwanese Military Police ordered 12,069 T91 combat rifles to equip garrison units in the Taipei capital region. Delivery would span over the next three years.

Export sales of the T91 to Jordan and Kuwait have been officially confirmed. The Jordanian Defense Forces reportedly conducted comparison tests between several service rifles in a desert environment. The T91 was found to have reliability comparable to the AK-47, scoring better than the M16, thereby making it very dependable for desert conditions.

Indonesia procured as many as 10,000 T91 combat rifles from Taiwan to equip police and border patrol units.

The UAE acquired T91 rifles after Sheikh Hamid bin Zayed Al Nahyan made a visit to Taiwan, and soon quantities of T91 were supplied to the UAE.

T91 uppers have also been exported to the United States through Wolf Performance Ammunition. When it was first released, Wolf was reported to have sold more than a thousand uppers in one day.

Users

: 5,000 rifles
: 100 rifles
: 1000 rifles 
: 10,000 rifles
: 20,000 rifles
: 18,000 rifles
: 240,000 rifles
: 10,000 rifles

See also 
 Defense industry of Taiwan

References

External links
 Modern Firearms - T65, T86 and T91 assault rifle (Taiwan)

5.56×45mm NATO assault rifles
Carbines
Short stroke piston firearms
Firearms of the Republic of China
ArmaLite AR-10 derivatives
AR-15 style rifles
Weapons and ammunition introduced in 2003